Joe Carson (born 24 November 1953) is a former professional footballer who spent his entire playing career in the Scottish leagues, playing mostly as a central defender.

Early life
Born in Helensburgh, Argyll & Bute, Scotland, Joe was brought up in the town of Alexandria, West Dunbartonshire. His younger brother, Tom Carson, was also a footballer and Dumbarton manager.

Career
Carson was awarded Motherwell's Player of the Year award for the 1986-1987 season. Carson is also the only player sent off two matches in a row against the same team, first in a league match on a Saturday then again in a cup game on a Wednesday night.

External links 

1953 births
Living people
People from Helensburgh
Scottish footballers
Scottish Football League players
Arbroath F.C. players
Motherwell F.C. players
Dumbarton F.C. players
Partick Thistle F.C. players
Stranraer F.C. players
Association football defenders
Sportspeople from Argyll and Bute